The Lobini H1 is a sports car produced by the Brazilian automaker Lobini. It first appeared in 2005 and went through a minor redesign in 2007. It has a carbon steel tubular chassis and a fiberglass body shell. It makes use of a Volkswagen 1.8L turbocharged 20V engine, the same used in some versions of both Volkswagen Golf and Audi A3.

Background
The Lobini H1 was idealized by José Orlando Lobo and Fábio Birolini, and is the first car to be produced by Lobini. It was designed by Graham Holmes, former Lotus designer, and was clearly inspired by the Lotus Elise. The car's prototype was first presented to the public at the 22nd São Paulo Motor Show, in 2002, and the first finished unit was sold in 2005. At that time, it was only available in the targa top configuration. In 2006, minor redesigns were announced for the 2007 model. Also, at the 26th São Paulo Motor Show a new coupé model was introduced and a racing model was shown.

Though it was well received by Brazilian enthusiasts, it is considered too expensive by most in that specific market. In fact, most of its production is directed towards the American and British markets.

Engine
The H1 has an I4, 20V turbocharged 1.8L engine, the same as used in the Brazilian Volkswagen Golf GTI, transversally mounted in front of the rear axle.

Sports cars
Rear mid-engine, rear-wheel-drive vehicles
Cars of Brazil

Cars introduced in 2005